Undo is a command in many computer programs.

Undo or UNDO may also refer to:

Music
 "Undo" (Rush of Fools song), a 2007 song by American contemporary Christian band Rush of Fools
 "Undo" (Sanna Nielsen song), a 2014 song by Swedish singer Sanna Nielsen
 "Undo", a song by Icelandic singer Björk on her fourth studio album Vespertine
 "UNDO", a song by Japanese rock band Cool Joke, the theme from Fullmetal Alchemist

Others
 Undo magazine, a Mexican visual design magazine
 Ukrainian National Democratic Alliance, the largest Ukrainian political party in the Second Polish Republic
 Undo (company), a software debugging company